SS Michael James Monohan was a Liberty ship built in the United States during World War II.

Construction
Michael James Monohan was laid down on 22 November 1944, under a Maritime Commission (MARCOM) contract, MC hull 2335, by J.A. Jones Construction, Panama City, Florida; sponsored by Mrs. W.P. Cornelius, the wife of Colonel W.P. Cornelius, US Army, she was launched on 4 January 1945.

History
She was allocated to Alcoa Steamship Co., Inc., on 17 January 1945. After a number of contracts, on 22 October 1947, she was laid up in the National Defense Reserve Fleet, Wilmington, North Carolina. On 14 April 1967, she was transferred to the US Navy for use as a Disposal Ship. She was scuttled with obsolete rocket motors off the coast of Virginia.

References

Bibliography

 
 
 
 
 
 

 

Liberty ships
Ships built in Panama City, Florida
1945 ships
Wilmington Reserve Fleet